Rathaus is an underground station in Cologne, Germany. It is located below the Alter Markt (de) and is named after the Rathaus (City hall).

History 
The construction of the station started in 2002 as part of the new north–south line (Nord-Süd-Stadtbahn). The station was opened on 9 December 2012 and was the terminus of line 5 until the opening of Heumarkt station on 15 December 2013.

Services 
When the Nord-Süd-Stadtbahn is completed, Rathaus will also be served by line 16.

Design 
The wall is designed with a defamiliarised sentence:

which translates to

See also 
 List of Cologne KVB stations

References

External links 

 station info page 
 

Cologne KVB stations
Innenstadt, Cologne
Railway stations in Germany opened in 2012
Cologne-Bonn Stadtbahn stations